John Theodore Cash FRS (16 December 1854 – 30 November 1936) was a British physician who was Professor of Materia Medica at the University of Aberdeen for 32 years.

He was born in Manchester, son of gentleman farmer John Walker Cash, and educated at the Quaker schools at Bootham in York and at Kendal. He studied medicine at the University of Edinburgh where he qualified MB in 1876 and MD in 1879. After a period of post-graduate work in Berlin, Vienna and Paris he returned to Berlin to carry out investigative work at the Physiological Institute on muscle behaviour and in Leipzig on the digestion of fats.

He then returned to London to take up a post at the pharmacological department of St Bartholomew's Hospital and published several papers on physiology. He was elected a Fellow of the Royal Society in 1887.

He was appointed Regius Professor of Materia Medica and Therapeutics at the University of Aberdeen in 1887, becoming Emeritus Professor on his retirement in 1919.

He died aged 82 at his home in Hereford. He had married Margaret Sophie, the daughter of the Rt Hon John Bright, with whom he had 2 daughters and 2 sons.

References

1854 births
1936 deaths
People in health professions from Manchester
Alumni of the University of Edinburgh
Fellows of the Royal Society
19th-century British medical doctors
20th-century British medical doctors
British physiologists
British Quakers